The Adivasi refers to ethnolinguistic minorities of the East, Central, West and South India The term is a Sanskrit word coined in the 1930s by political activists to give the tribal people an indigenous identity by claiming an indigenous origin. The term is also used for ethnic minorities, such as Chakmas of Bangladesh,  Adivasi Janjati of Nepal, and Vedda of Sri Lanka. The Constitution of India does not use the word Adivasi, instead referring to Scheduled Tribes and Janjati. The government of India does not officially recognise tribes as indigenous people. The country ratified the International Labour Organization (ILO) Convention 107 on Indigenous and Tribal Peoples of the United Nations (1957) and refused to sign the ILO Convention 169. Most of these groups are included in the Scheduled Tribe category under constitutional provisions in India.

They comprise a substantial minority population of India and Bangladesh, making up 8.6% of India's population and 1.1% of Bangladesh's, or 104.2 million people in India, according to the 2011 census, and 2 million people in Bangladesh according to the 2010 estimate. Adivasi societies are particularly prominent in Telangana, Andhra Pradesh, Chhattisgarh, Gujarat, Jharkhand, Madhya Pradesh, Maharashtra, Odisha,  Rajasthan, West Bengal, and Northeast India, and the Andaman and Nicobar Islands of India, and Feni, Khagrachari, Bandarban, Rangamati, and Cox's Bazar.

Though claimed to be one of the original inhabitants of India, many present-day Adivasi communities formed after the decline of the Indus Valley civilisation, harboring various degrees of ancestry from ancient hunter-gatherers, Indus Valley civilisation, Indo-Aryan, Austroasiatic and Tibeto-Burman language speakers. Ancestors of Munda peoples in India were migrant from South-east Asia around 4000-3500 year ago.

Tribal languages can be categorised into seven linguistic groupings, namely Andamanese; Austro-Asiatic; Dravidian; Indo-Aryan; Nihali; Sino-Tibetan; and Kra-Dai.

Tribals of East, Central, West and South India use the politically assertive term Adivasi, while Tribes of North East India use 'Tribe' or 'Scheduled Tribe (ST)' and do not use term Adivasi for themselves. Adivasi studies is a new scholarly field, drawing upon archaeology, anthropology, agrarian history, environmental history, subaltern studies, indigenous studies, aboriginal studies, and developmental economics. It adds debates that are specific to the Indian context.

Definition and etymology
Adivasi is the collective term for the Tribes of the Indian subcontinent, who are considered to be the indigenous people of India. prior to the Dravidians and Indo-Aryans. It refers to "any of various ethnic groups considered to be the original inhabitants of the Indian subcontinent." However, Tribal and Adivasi have different meanings. Tribal means a social unit whereas Adivasi means ancient inhabitants. India does not recognise tribes as indigenous people. India ratified the International Labour Organization (ILO) Convention 107 on Indigenous and Tribal Peoples of the United Nations (1957). In 1989, India refused to sign the ILO Convention 169.

The term Adivasi, in fact, is a modern Sanskrit word specifically coined in the 1930s by tribal political activists to give a differentiated indigenous identity to tribals by alleging that Indo-European and Dravidian speaking peoples are not indigenous. 
The word was used by Thakkar Bapa to refer to inhabitants of forest in 1930s. The word was used in 1936 and included in English dictionary prepared by Pascal. The term was recognised by Markandey Katju the judge of the Supreme Court of India in 2011. In Hindi and Bengali, Adivasi means "Original Inhabitants," from ādi 'beginning, origin'; and vāsin 'dweller' (itself from vas 'to dwell'), thus literally meaning 'beginning inhabitant'. Tribal of India and different political parties are continuing the use of word Adivasi as they believe the word unite tribal people of India.

Although terms such as atavika, vanavāsi ("forest dwellers"), or girijan ("mountain people") are also used for the tribes of India, adivāsi carries the specific meaning of being the original and autochthonous inhabitants of a given region, and the self-designation of those tribal groups.

Constitution of India, don't use word Adivasi and directed government officials to not use the word in official documents. Tribal are known as Scheduled Tribes and Janjati in Constitution. The constitution of India grouped these ethnic groups together "as targets for social and economic development. Since that time the tribe of India have been known officially as Scheduled Tribes." Article 366 (25) defined scheduled tribes as "such tribes or tribal communities or parts of or groups within such tribes or tribal communities as are deemed under Article 342 to be Scheduled Tribes for the purposes of this constitution".

The term Adivasi is also used for the ethnic minorities of Bangladesh, the Vedda people of Sri Lanka and the native Tharu people of Nepal. Another Nepalese term is Adivasi Janjati, although the political context differed historically under the Shah and Rana dynasties.

In India, opposition to the usage of the term is varied. Critics argue that the "original inhabitant" contention is based on the fact that they have no land and are therefore asking for land reform. The Adivasis argue that they have been oppressed by the "superior group" and that they require and demand a reward, more specifically land reform. Adivasi issues are not related to land reforms but to the historical rights to the forests that were alienated during the colonial period. In 2006, India finally made a law to "undo the historical injustice" committed to the Adivasis.

Tribal of North East India don't use the term adivasi for themselves and use the word tribe. In Assam, the term adivāsi applies only to the Tea-tribes imported from Central India during colonial times.

Demographics

A substantial list of Scheduled Tribes in India are recognised as tribal under the Constitution of India. Tribal people constitute 8.6% of India's population and 1.1% of Bangladesh's, 

One concentration lies in a belt along the northwest Himalayas: consisting of Jammu and Kashmir, where are found many semi-nomadic groups, to Ladakh and northern Himachal Pradesh and Uttarakhand, where are found Tibeto-Burman groups.

In the northeastern states of Arunachal Pradesh, Meghalaya, Mizoram, and Nagaland, more than 90% of the population is tribal. However, in the remaining northeast states of Assam, Manipur, Sikkim, and Tripura, tribal peoples form between 20 and 30% of the population.

The largest population of tribals lives in a belt stretching from eastern Gujarat and Rajasthan in the west all the way to western West Bengal, a region known as the tribal belt. These tribes correspond roughly to three regions. The western region, in eastern Gujarat, southeastern Rajasthan, northwestern Maharashtra as well as western Madhya Pradesh, is dominated by Indo-Aryan speaking tribes like the Bhils. The central region, covering eastern Maharashtra and Madhya Pradesh, western and southern Chhattisgarh, northern and eastern Telangana, northern Andhra Pradesh and western Odisha is dominated by Dravidian tribes like the Gonds and Khonds. The eastern belt, centred on the Chhota Nagpur Plateau in Jharkhand and adjacent areas of Chhattisgarh, Odisha and West Bengal, is dominated by Munda tribes like the Bhumijs, Hos and Santals. Roughly 75% of the total tribal population live in this belt, although the tribal population there accounts for only around 10% of the region's total population.
 
Further south, the region near Bellary in Karnataka has a large concentration of tribals, mostly Boyas/ Valmikis. Small pockets can be found throughout the rest of South India. By far the largest of these pockets is in found in the region containing the Nilgiris district of Tamil Nadu, Wayanad district of Kerala and nearby hill ranges of Chamarajanagar and Mysore districts of southern Karnataka. Further south, only small pockets of tribal settlement remain in the Western and Eastern Ghats.

The scheduled tribe population in Jharkhand constitutes 26.2% of the state. Tribals in Jharkhand mainly follow Sarnaism, an animistic religion. Chhattisgarh has also over 80 lakh scheduled tribe population. Assam has over 60 lakh Adivasis primarily as tea workers. Adivasis in India mainly follow Animism, Hinduism and Christianity.

In the case of Bangladesh, most Adivasi groups are found in the Chittagong hill tracks along the border with Myanmar, in Sylhet and in the Northwest of Bangladesh. In Sylhet and in the north west you can find groups such as the Sauria Paharia, Kurukh, Santal, Munda and more, and other groups such as the Pnar, Garo, Meitei, Bishnupriya Manipuri and more. In the Chittagong Hill tracts you can find variouse Tibeto-Burman groups such as the Marma, Chakma, Bawm, Tripuri, Mizo, Mru, Rakhine and more. In Bangladesh most Adivasis are Buddhists who follow the Theravada school of Buddhism, Animism and Christianity are also followed in fact Buddhism has affected Adivasis so much that it has influenced local Animistic beliefs of other Adivasis.

History

Origin
Though claimed to be the original inhabitants of India, many present-day Adivasi communities formed after the decline of the Indus Valley civilisation, harboring various degrees of ancestry from ancient hunter-gatherers, Indus Valley civilisation, Indo-Aryan, Austroasiatic and Tibeto-Burman language speakers. Only tribal people of Andaman Islands remained isolated for more than 25000 years.

Ancient & medieval period
According to linguist Anvita Abbi, tribe in India are charterised by distinct lifestyle and are outside of caste system. 
Although considered uncivilised and primitive, Adivasis were usually not held to be intrinsically impure by surrounding populations (usually Dravidian or Indo-Aryan), unlike Dalits, who were. Thus, the Adivasi origins of Valmiki, who composed the Ramayana, were acknowledged, as were the origins of Adivasi tribes such as the Garasia and Bhilala, which descended from mixed Rajput and Bhil marriages. Unlike the subjugation of the Dalits, the Adivasis often enjoyed autonomy and, depending on region, evolved mixed hunter-gatherer and farming economies, controlling their lands as a joint patrimony of the tribe. In some areas, securing Adivasi approval and support was considered crucial by local rulers, and larger Adivasi groups were able to sustain their own kingdoms in central India. The Meenas and Gond Rajas of Garha-Mandla and Chanda are examples of an Adivasi aristocracy that ruled in this region, and were "not only the hereditary leaders of their Gond subjects, but also held sway over substantial communities of non-tribals who recognized them as their feudal lords."

The historiography of relationships between the Adivasis and the rest of Indian society is patchy. There are references to alliances between Ahom Kings of Brahmaputra valley and the hill Nagas.
This relative autonomy and collective ownership of Adivasi land by Adivasis was severely disrupted by the advent of the Mughals in the early 16th century. Rebellions against Mughal authority include the Bhil Rebellion of 1632 and the Bhil-Gond Insurrection of 1643 which were both pacified by Mughal soldiers. With the advent of the Kachwaha Rajputs and Mughals into their territory, the Meenas were gradually sidelined and pushed deep into the forests. As a result, historical literature has completely bypassed the Meena tribe. The combined army of Mughals and Bharmal attacked the tribal king Bada Meena and killed him damaging 52 kots and 56 gates. Bada's treasure was shared between Mughals and Bharmal.

British period (c. 1857 – 1947)
During the period of British rule, the colonial administration encroached upon the adivasi tribal system, which led to widespread resentment against the British among the tribesmen. The tribesmen frequently supported rebellions or rebelled themselves, while their raja looked negatively upon the British administrative innovations. Beginning in the 18th century, the British added to the consolidation of feudalism in India, first under the Jagirdari system and then under the zamindari system. Beginning with the Permanent Settlement imposed by the British in Bengal and Bihar, which later became the template for a deepening of feudalism throughout India, the older social and economic system in the country began to alter radically. Land, both forest areas belonging to adivasis and settled farmland belonging to non-adivasi peasants, was rapidly made the legal property of British-designated zamindars (landlords), who in turn moved to extract the maximum economic benefit possible from their newfound property and subjects. Adivasi lands sometimes experienced an influx of non-local settlers, often brought from far away (as in the case of Muslims and Sikhs brought to Kol territory) by the zamindars to better exploit local land, forest and labour. Deprived of the forests and resources they traditionally depended on and sometimes coerced to pay taxes, many adivasis were forced to borrow at usurious rates from moneylenders, often the zamindars themselves. When they were unable to pay, that forced them to become bonded labourers for the zamindars. Often, far from paying off the principal of their debt, they were unable even to offset the compounding interest, and this was made the justification for their children working for the zamindar after the death of the initial borrower. In the case of the Andamanese adivasis, their protective isolation changed with the establishment of a British colonial presence on the islands. Lacking immunity against common infectious diseases of the Eurasian mainland, the large Jarawa habitats on the southeastern regions of South Andaman Island experienced a massive population decline due to disease within four years of the establishment of a colonial presence on the island in 1789.

Land dispossession by the zamindars or interference by the colonial government resulted in a number of Adivasi revolts in the late eighteenth and early nineteenth centuries, such as the Bhumij rebellion of 1767-1833 and Santal hul (or Santhal rebellion) of 1855–56. Although these were suppressed by the governing British authority (the East India Company prior to 1858, and the British government after 1858), partial restoration of privileges to adivasi elites (e.g. to Mankis, the leaders of Munda tribes) and some leniency in levels of taxation resulted in relative calm in the region, despite continuing and widespread dispossession from the late nineteenth century onwards. The economic deprivation, in some cases, triggered internal adivasi migrations within India that would continue for another century, including as labour for the emerging tea plantations in Assam.

Participation in Indian independence movement

There were tribal reform and rebellion movements during the period of the British Empire, some of which also participated in the Indian independence movement or attacked mission posts. There were several Adivasis in the Indian independence movement including Birsa Munda, Dharindhar Bhyuan, Laxman Naik, Jantya Bhil, Bangaru Devi and Rehma Vasave, Mangri Oroan.

During the period of British rule, India saw the rebellions of several then backward castes, mainly tribal peoples that revolted against British rule. These were:

 Halba rebellion (1774–79)
 Chakma rebellion (1776–1787)
 Chuar rebellion in Bengal (1795–1809)
 Bhopalpatnam Struggle (1795)
 Khurda Rebellion in Odisha (1817)
 Bhil rebellion (1822–1857)
 Ho-Munda Revolt(1816–1837)
 Paralkot rebellion (1825)
 Bhumij Rebellion (1832-33)
 Khond rebellion (1836)
 Tarapur rebellion (1842–54)
 Maria rebellion (1842–63)
 First Freedom Struggle By Sidu Murmu and Kanu Murmu (1856–57)
 Bhil rebellion, begun by Tatya Tope in Banswara (1858)
 Koli revolt (1859)
 Great Kuki Invasion of 1860s
 Gond rebellion, begun by Ramji Gond in Adilabad (1860)
 Muria rebellion (1876)
 Rani rebellion (1878–82)
 Bhumkal (1910)
 The Kuki Uprising (1917–1919) in Manipur
 Rampa Rebellion of 1879, Vizagapatnam (now Visakhapatnam district)
 Rampa Rebellion (1922–1924), Visakhapatnam district
 Santhal rebellion (1885–1886)
 Munda rebellion (1899 - 1900)
 Thanu Nayak arm struggle against Nizam in Telangana in 1940s

Major Adivasi groups
There are more than 700 tribal groups in India. List of Scheduled Tribes in India.

 Asurs
 Baigas
 Bhils 
 Bhumijs
 Birhors
 Bodos
 Chakmas
 Garos
 Gonds
 Hos
 Irulas
 Kharias
 Khasis
 Kotas
 Meenas
 Mundas
 Santhals
 Tharus
 Todas

Tribal languages 
Tribal languages can be categorised into five linguistic groupings, namely Andamanese; Austro-Asiatic; Dravidian; Indo-Aryan; and Sino-Tibetan.

Arakanese language
 Banjari language
Bawm language
 Bhil language
 Bhotiya language
 Bhumij language
 Bodo language
 Bonda language
Chakma language
 Chenchu language
 Dhodia language
 Gamit language
 Gondi language
 Gujari language
 Halbi language
 Ho language
 Irula language
 Jaunsari language
 Karbi language
 Khasi language
Koch language
Koda language
 Kokborok language
 Kora language
 Kui language
 Kuki language
 Kurukh language
 Mavchi language
 Mizo language
 Mundari language
Pangkhu language
 Paniya language
Pnar language
 Rathwa language
Sak language
 Santali language
Shö language
 Tharu language
 Varli language
 Vasavi language

Adivasi literature
Adivasi literature is the literature composed by the tribals of the Indian subcontinent. It is composed in more than 100 languages. The tradition of tribal literature includes oral literature and written literature in tribal languages ​​and non-tribal languages. The basic feature of tribal literature is the presence of tribal philosophy in it. Prominent tribal writers include Nirmala Putul, Vahru Sonawane, Temsula Ao, Mamang Dai, Narayan, Rose Kerketta, Ram Dayal Munda, Vandana Tete, Anuj Lugun etc.

Religion

The religious practices of Adivasis communities mostly resemble various shades of Hinduism. In the census of India from 1871 to 1941, tribals have been counted in different religions from other religions, 1891 (forest tribe), 1901 (animist), 1911 (tribal animist), 1921 (hill and forest tribe), 1931 (primitive tribe), 1941 (tribes), However, since the census of 1951, the tribal population has been stopped separately. Many Adivasis have been converted into Christianity during British period and after independence. During the last two decades Adivasi from Odisha, Madhya Pradesh, Jharkhand have converted to Protestant groups as a result of increased missionaries presence.

Adivasi beliefs vary by tribe, and are usually different from the historical Vedic religion, with its monistic underpinnings, Indo-European deities (who are often cognates of ancient Iranian, Greek and Roman deities, e.g. Mitra/Mithra/Mithras), lack of idol worship and lack of a concept of reincarnation.

Animism

Animism (from Latin animus, -i "soul, life") is the worldview that non-human entities (animals, plants, and inanimate objects or phenomena) possess a spiritual essence. The Encyclopaedia of Religion and Society estimates that 1–5% of India's population is animist. India's government recognises that India's indigenous subscribe to pre-Hindu animist-based religions.

Animism is used in the anthropology of religion as a term for the belief system of some indigenous tribal peoples, especially prior to the development of organised religion. Although each culture has its own different mythologies and rituals, "animism" is said to describe the most common, foundational thread of indigenous peoples' "spiritual" or "supernatural" perspectives. The animistic perspective is so fundamental, mundane, everyday and taken-for-granted that most animistic indigenous people do not even have a word in their languages that corresponds to "animism" (or even "religion"); the term is an anthropological construct rather than one designated by the people themselves.

Donyi-Polo

Donyi-Polo is the designation given to the indigenous religions, of animistic and shamanic type, of the Tani, from Arunachal Pradesh, in northeastern India. The name "Donyi-Polo" means "Sun-Moon".

Sarnaism

Sarnaism or Sarna (local languages: Sarna Dhorom, meaning "religion of the holy woods") defines the indigenous religions of the Adivasi populations of the states of Central-East India, such as the Munda, the Ho, the Santali, the Khuruk, and the others. The Munda, Ho, Santhal and Oraon tribe followed the Sarna religion, where Sarna means sacred grove. Their religion is based on the oral traditions passed from generation-to-generation. It involves worship of village deity, Sun and Moon.

Other tribal animist
Animist hunter gatherer Nayaka people of Nilgiri hills of South India.

Animism is the traditional religion of Nicobarese people; their religion is marked by the dominance and interplay with spirit worship, witch doctors and animal sacrifice.

Hinduism

Adivasi roots of modern Hinduism
Some historians and anthropologists assert that many Hindu practices might have been adopted from Adivasi culture. This also includes the sacred status of certain animals such as monkeys, cows, fish (matsya), peacocks, cobras (nagas) and elephants and plants such as the sacred fig (pipal), Ocimum tenuiflorum (tulsi) and Azadirachta indica (neem), which may once have held totemic importance for certain adivasi tribes.

Adivasi saints
A sant is an Indian holy man, and a title of a devotee or ascetic, especially in north and east India. Generally, a holy or saintly person is referred to as a mahatma, paramahamsa, or swami, or given the prefix Sri or Srila before their name. The term is sometimes misrepresented in English as "Hindu saint", although "sant" is unrelated to "saint".
 Sant Buddhu Bhagat, led the Kol Insurrection (1831–1832) aimed against tax imposed on Mundas by Muslim rulers.
 Sant Dhira or Kannappa Nayanar, one of 63 Nayanar Shaivite sants, a hunter from whom Lord Shiva gladly accepted food offerings. It is said that he poured water from his mouth on the Shivlingam and offered the Lord swine flesh.
 Sant Dhudhalinath, Gujarati, a 17th or 18th-century devotee (P. 4, The Story of Historic People of India-The Kolis)
 Sant Ganga Narain Singh, led the Bhumij Revolt (1832–1833) aimed against Christian missionaries and the East India Company.
 Sant Gurudev Kalicharan Brahma or Guru Brahma, a Bodo who founded the Brahma Dharma aimed against Christian missionaries and colonialists. The Brahma Dharma movement sought to unite peoples of all religions to worship God together and survives even today.
 Sant Kalu Dev, Punjab, related with Fishermen community Nishadha
 Sant Kubera, ethnic Gujarati, taught for over 35 years and had 20,000 followers in his time.
 Sant Jatra Oraon, Oraon, led the Tana Bhagat Movement (1914–1919) aimed against the Christian missionaries and the British colonial government
 Sant Tantya Mama (Bhil), a Bhil after whom a movement is named after – the "Jananayak Tantya Bhil"
 Sant Tirumangai Alvar, Kallar, composed the six Vedangas in beautiful Tamil verse
 Saint Kalean Guru (Kalean Murmu) is the most beloved person among Santal Tribes community who was widely popular 'Nagam Guru' Guru of Early Histories in fourteen century by the references of their forefathers.

Sages
 Bhakta Shabari, a Nishadha woman who offered Shri Rama and Shri Laxmana her half-eaten ber fruit, which they gratefully accepted when they were searching for Shri Sita Devi in the forest.

Maharishis
 Maharshi Matanga, Matanga Bhil, Guru of Bhakta Shabari. In fact, Chandalas are often addressed as 'Matanga 'in passages like Varaha Purana 1.139.91

Avatars
 Birsa Bhagwan or Birsa Munda, considered an avatar of Khasra Kora. People approached him as Singbonga, the Sun god. His sect included Christian converts. He and his clan, the Mundas, were connected with Vaishnavite traditions as they were influenced by Sri Chaitanya. Birsa was very close to the Panre brothers Vaishnavites.
 Kirata – the form of Lord Shiva as a hunter. It is mentioned in the Mahabharata. The Karppillikkavu Sree Mahadeva Temple, Kerala adores Lord Shiva in this avatar and is known to be one of the oldest surviving temples in Bharat.
 Vettakkorumakan, the son of Lord Kirata.
 Kaladutaka or 'Vaikunthanatha', Kallar (robber), avatar of Lord Vishnu.

Other tribals and Hinduism
Some Hindus do not believe that Indian tribals are close to the romantic ideal of the ancient silvan culture of the Vedic people. Madhav Sadashiv Golwalkar said:

At the Lingaraja Temple in Bhubaneswar, there are Brahmin and Badu (tribal) priests. The Badus have the most intimate contact with the deity of the temple, and only they can bathe and adorn it.

The Bhils are mentioned in the Mahabharata. The Bhil boy Ekalavya's teacher was Drona, and he had the honour to be invited to Yudhishthira's Rajasuya Yajna at Indraprastha. Indian tribals were also part of royal armies in the Ramayana and in the Arthashastra.

Shabari was a Bhil woman who offered Rama and Lakshmana jujubes when they were searching for Sita in the forest. Matanga, a Bhil, became a Brahmana.

Brahmanization and Rajputization
Bhangya Bhukya notes that during the final years of the British Raj, while education introduced Westernization in the hilly areas of central India, the regions also parallelly underwent the Manuvadi Hinduization and Rajputization processes. The Gond people and their chiefs started doing the "caste–Hindu practices" and frequently claimed the "Rajput, and thus kshatriya status". The British government used to support these claims as they viewed the adivasi society to be less civilized than the caste society and believed that adivasi peoples' association with the castes would make the adivasis "more civilized and sober" and "easier for the colonial state to control". Bhukya also points out that central India's "Raj Gond families" had already adopted the religious and social traditions of the Rajputs before the British Raj in India, and there were "matrimonial relations" between a number of Gond and Rajput Rajas. However, the British governments' policies of offering "zamindari rights, village headships and patelships" fueled the process.

According to Patit Paban Mishra, "the 'ksatriyaization' of tribal rulers and their surroundings, resulted in the Hinduization of tribal areas".

Demands for a separate religious code
Some Adivasi organisations have demanded that a distinct religious code be listed for Adivasis in the 2011 census of India. The All India Adivasi Conference was held on 1 and 2 January 2011 at Burnpur, Asansol, West Bengal. 750 delegates were present from all parts of India and cast their votes for Religion code as follows: Sari Dhorom – 632, Sarna – 51, Kherwalism – 14 and Other Religions – 03. Census of India.

Education

Tribal communities in India are the least educationally developed. First generation learners have to face social, psychological and cultural barriers to get education. This has been one of the reasons for poor performance of tribal students in schools. Poor literacy rate since independence has resulted in absence of tribals in academia and higher education. The literacy rate for STs has gone up from 8.5% (male – 13.8%, female – 3.2%) in 1961 to 29.6% (male – 40.6%, female – 18.2%) in 1991 and to 40% (male – 59%, female – 37%) in 1999–2000. States with large proportion of STs like Mizoram, Nagaland and Meghalaya have high literacy rate while states with large number of tribals like Madhya Pradesh, Odisha, Rajasthan and Andhra Pradesh have low tribal literacy rate. Tribal students have very high drop-out rates during school education.

Extending the system of primary education into tribal areas and reserving places for needing them, they say, to work in the fields. On the other hand, in those parts of the northeast where tribes have generally been spared the wholesale onslaught of outsiders, schooling has helped tribal people to secure political and economic benefits. The education system there has provided a corps of highly trained tribal members in the professions and high-ranking administrative posts. tribal children in middle and high schools and higher education institutions are central to government policy, but efforts to improve a tribe's educational status have had mixed results. Recruitment of qualified teachers and determination of the appropriate language of instruction also remain troublesome. Commission after commission on the "language question" has called for instruction, at least at the primary level, in the students' native language. In some regions, tribal children entering school must begin by learning the official regional language, often one completely unrelated to their tribal language.

Many tribal schools are plagued by high drop-out rates. Children attend for the first three to four years of primary school and gain a smattering of knowledge, only to lapse into illiteracy later. Few who enter continue up to the tenth grade; of those who do, few manage to finish high school. Therefore, very few are eligible to attend institutions of higher education, where the high rate of attrition continues. Members of agrarian tribes like the Gonds often are reluctant to send their children to school,

An academy for teaching and preserving Adivasi languages and culture was established in 1999 by the Bhasha Research and Publication Centre. The Adivasi Academy is located at Tejgadh in Gujarat.

Economy
Most tribes are concentrated in heavily forested areas that combine inaccessibility with limited political or economic significance. Historically, the economy of most tribes was subsistence agriculture or hunting and gathering. Tribal members traded with outsiders for the few necessities they lacked, such as salt and iron. A few local Hindu craftsmen might provide such items as cooking utensils.

In the early 20th century, however, large areas fell into the hands of non-tribals, on account of improved transportation and communications. Around 1900, many regions were opened by the British government to settlement through a scheme by which inward migrants received ownership of land free in return for cultivating it. For tribal people, however, land was often viewed as a common resource, free to whoever needed it. By the time tribals accepted the necessity of obtaining formal land titles, they had lost the opportunity to lay claim to lands that might rightfully have been considered theirs. The colonial and post-independence regimes belatedly realised the necessity of protecting tribals from the predations of outsiders and prohibited the sale of tribal lands. Although an important loophole in the form of land leases was left open, tribes made some gains in the mid-twentieth century, and some land was returned to tribal peoples despite obstruction by local police and land officials.

In the 1970s, tribal peoples came again under intense land pressure, especially in central India. Migration into tribal lands increased dramatically, as tribal people lost the titles to their lands in many ways – lease, forfeiture from debts, or bribery of land registry officials. Other non-tribals simply squatted or even lobbied governments to classify them as tribal to allow them to compete with the formerly established tribes. In any case, many tribal members became landless labourers in the 1960s and 1970s, and regions that a few years earlier had been the exclusive domain of tribes had an increasingly mixed population of tribals and non-tribals. Government efforts to evict nontribal members from illegal occupation have proceeded slowly; when evictions occur at all, those ejected are usually members of poor, lower castes.

Improved communications, roads with motorised traffic, and more frequent government intervention figured in the increased contact that tribal peoples had with outsiders. Commercial highways and cash crops frequently drew non-tribal people into remote areas. By the 1960s and 1970s, the resident nontribal shopkeeper was a permanent feature of many tribal villages. Since shopkeepers often sell goods on credit (demanding high interest), many tribal members have been drawn deeply into debt or mortgaged their land. Merchants also encourage tribals to grow cash crops (such as cotton or castor-oil plants), which increases tribal dependence on the market for necessities. Indebtedness is so extensive that although such transactions are illegal, traders sometimes 'sell' their debtors to other merchants, much like indentured peons.

The final blow for some tribes has come when non-tribals, through political jockeying, have managed to gain legal tribal status, that is, to be listed as a Scheduled Tribe.

Tribes in the Himalayan foothills have not been as hard-pressed by the intrusions of non-tribal. Historically, their political status was always distinct from the rest of India. Until the British colonial period, there was little effective control by any of the empires centred in peninsular India; the region was populated by autonomous feuding tribes. The British, in efforts to protect the sensitive northeast frontier, followed a policy dubbed the "Inner Line"; non-tribal people were allowed into the areas only with special permission. Post-colonial governments have continued the policy, protecting the Himalayan tribes as part of the strategy to secure the border with China.

Ecological threats
Many smaller tribal groups are quite sensitive to ecological degradation caused by modernisation. Both commercial forestry and intensive agriculture have proved destructive to the forests that had endured swidden agriculture for many centuries. Adivasis in central part of India have been victims of the Salwa Judum campaign by the Government against the Naxalite insurgency.

Government policies on forest reserves have affected tribal peoples profoundly. Government efforts to reserve forests have precipitated armed (if futile) resistance on the part of the tribal peoples involved. Intensive exploitation of forests has often meant allowing outsiders to cut large areas of trees (while the original tribal inhabitants were restricted from cutting), and ultimately replacing mixed forests capable of sustaining tribal life with single-product plantations. Non-tribals have frequently bribed local officials to secure the effective use of reserved forest lands.

The northern tribes have thus been sheltered from the kind of exploitation that those elsewhere in South Asia have suffered. In Arunachal Pradesh (formerly part of the North-East Frontier Agency), for example, tribal members control commerce and most lower-level administrative posts. Government construction projects in the region have provided tribes with a significant source of cash. Some tribes have made rapid progress through the education system (the role of early missionaries was significant in this regard). Instruction was begun in Assamese but was eventually changed to Hindi; by the early 1980s, English was taught at most levels. Northeastern tribal people have thus enjoyed a certain
measure of social mobility.

The continuing economic alienation and exploitation of many adivasis was highlighted as a "systematic failure" by the Indian prime minister Manmohan Singh in a 2009 conference of chief ministers of all 29 Indian states, where he also cited this as a major cause of the Naxalite unrest that has affected areas such as the Red Corridor.

Tribal classification criteria and demands

The criteria presently followed for specification of a community as a Scheduled Tribe are : (i) indications of primitive traits, (ii) distinctive culture, (iii) geographical isolation, (iv) shyness of contact with the community at large, and (v) backwardness.

Population complexities, and the controversies surrounding ethnicity and language in India, sometimes make the official recognition of groups as Adivasis (by way of inclusion in the Scheduled Tribes list) political and contentious. However, regardless of their language family affiliations, Australoid and Negrito groups that have survived as distinct forest, mountain or island-dwelling tribes in India and are often classified as Adivasi. The relatively autonomous tribal groups of Northeastern India (including Khasis, Apatani and Nagas), who are mostly Austro-Asiatic or Tibeto-Burman speakers, are also considered to be tribals: this area comprises 7.5% of India's land area but 20% of its tribal population. However, not all autonomous northeastern groups are considered tribals; for instance, the Tibeto-Burman-speaking Meitei of Manipur were once tribal but, having been settled for many centuries, are caste Hindus.

It is also difficult, for a given social grouping, to definitively decide whether it is a "caste" or a "tribe". A combination of internal social organisation, relationship with other groups, self-classification and perception by other groups has to be taken into account to make a categorisation, which is at best inexact and open to doubt. These categorisations have been diffused for thousands of years, and even ancient formulators of caste-discriminatory legal codes (which usually only applied to settled populations, and not Adivasis) were unable to come up with clean distinctions.

Demands for tribal classification
The additional difficulty in deciding whether a group meets the criteria to be Adivasi or not are the aspirational movements created by the federal and state benefits, including job and educational reservations, enjoyed by groups listed as scheduled tribes (STs). In Manipur, Meitei commentators have pointed to the lack of scheduled tribe status as a key economic disadvantage for Meiteis competing for jobs against groups that are classified as scheduled tribes. In Assam, Rajbongshi representatives have demanded scheduled tribe status as well. In Rajasthan, the Gujjar community has demanded ST status, even blockading the national capital of Delhi to press their demand. However, the Government of Rajasthan declined the Gujjars' demand, stating the Gujjars are treated as upper caste and are by no means a tribe. In several cases, these claims to tribalhood are disputed by tribes who are already listed in the schedule and fear economic losses if more powerful groups are recognised as scheduled tribes; for instance, the Rajbongshi demand faces resistance from the Bodo tribe, and the Meena tribe has vigorously opposed Gujjar aspirations to be recognised as a scheduled tribe.

Endogamy, exogamy and ethnogenesis
Part of the challenge is that the endogamous nature of tribes is also conformed to by the vast majority of Hindu castes. Indeed, many historians and anthropologists believe that caste endogamy reflects the once-tribal origins of the various groups who now constitute the settled Hindu castes. Another defining feature of caste Hindu society, which is often used to contrast them with Muslim and other social groupings, is lineage/clan (or gotra) and village exogamy. However, these in-marriage taboos are also held ubiquitously among tribal groups, and do not serve as reliable differentiating markers between caste and tribe. Again, this could be an ancient import from tribal society into settled Hindu castes. Tribes such as the Muslim Gujjars of Kashmir and the Kalash of Pakistan observe these exogamous traditions in common with caste Hindus and non-Kashmiri adivasis, though their surrounding Muslim populations do not.

Tribals are not part of the caste system, Some anthropologists, however, draw a distinction between tribes who have continued to be tribal and tribes that have been absorbed into caste society in terms of the breakdown of tribal (and therefore caste) boundaries, and the proliferation of new mixed caste groups. In other words, ethnogenesis (the construction of new ethnic identities) in tribes occurs through a fission process (where groups splinter-off as new tribes, which preserves endogamy), whereas with settled castes it usually occurs through intermixture (in violation of strict endogamy).

Tribals and are often regarded as constituting egalitarian societies. However, many scholars argue that the claim that tribals are an egalitarian society in contrast to a caste-based society is a part of a larger political agenda by some to maximise any differences from tribal and urban societies. According to scholar Koenraad Elst, caste practices and social taboos among Indian tribals date back to antiquity:

Other criteria
Unlike castes, which form part of a complex and interrelated local economic exchange system, tribes tend to form self-sufficient economic units. For most tribal people, land-use rights traditionally derive simply from tribal membership. Tribal society tends to the egalitarian, with its leadership based on ties of kinship and personality rather than on hereditary status. Tribes typically consist of segmentary lineages whose extended families provide the basis for social organisation and control. Tribal religion recognises no authority outside the tribe.

Any of these criteria may not apply in specific instances. Language does not always give an accurate indicator of tribal or caste status. Especially in regions of mixed population, many tribal groups have lost their original languages and simply speak local or regional languages. In parts of Assam—an area historically divided between warring tribes and villages—increased contact among villagers began during the colonial period, and has accelerated since independence in 1947. A pidgin Assamese developed, whereas educated tribal members learnt Hindi and, in the late twentieth century, English.

Self-identification and group loyalty do not provide unfailing markers of tribal identity either. In the case of stratified tribes, the loyalties of clan, kin, and family may well predominate over those of tribe. In addition, tribes cannot always be viewed as people living apart; the degree of isolation of various tribes has varied tremendously. The Gonds, Santals, and Bhils traditionally have dominated the regions in which they have lived. Moreover, tribal society is not always more egalitarian than the rest of the rural populace; some of the larger tribes, such as the Gonds, are highly stratified.

The apparently wide fluctuation in estimates of South Asia's tribal population through the twentieth century gives a sense of how unclear the distinction between tribal and nontribal can be. India's 1931 census enumerated 22 million tribal people, in 1941 only 10 million were counted, but by 1961 some 30 million and in 1991 nearly 68 million tribal members were included. The differences among the figures reflect changing census criteria and the economic incentives individuals have to maintain or reject classification as a tribal member.

These gyrations of census data serve to underline the complex relationship between caste and tribe. Although, in theory, these terms represent different ways of life and ideal types, in reality, they stand for a continuum of social groups. In areas of substantial contact between tribes and castes, social and cultural pressures have often tended to move tribes in the direction of becoming castes over a period of years. Tribal peoples with ambitions for social advancement in Indian society at large have tried to gain the classification of caste for their tribes. On occasion, an entire tribe or part of a tribe joined a Hindu sect and thus entered the caste system en masse. If a specific tribe engaged in practices that Hindus deemed polluting, the tribe's status when it was assimilated into the caste hierarchy would be affected.

Constitutional safeguards for Scheduled Tribes
A number of constitutional and juridical safeguards for Adivasi have been encoded.

Particularly vulnerable tribal groups
The Scheduled Tribe groups who were identified as more isolated from the wider community and who maintain a distinctive cultural identity have been categorised as "Particularly Vulnerable Tribal Groups" (PVTGs) previously known as Primitive Tribal Groups by the Government at the Centre. So far 75 tribal communities have been identified as 'particularly vulnerable tribal groups' in 18 States and UT of Andaman & Nicobar Islands of India. These hunting, food-gathering, and some agricultural communities have been identified as less acculturated tribes among the tribal population groups and in need of special programmes for their sustainable development. The tribes are awakening and demanding their rights for special reservation quota for them.

Notable Adivasis

 Kaluram Dhodade

Academics
Motiravan Kangali (1949–2015) – Linguist 
Sonajharia Minz - Computer Scientist
Pandit Raghunath Murmu – Ol Chiki (Santali) script creator, writer, activist
Lako Bodra – Varang Kshiti script creator, writer, activist
Rohidas Singh Nag -Mundari Bani script creator, linguist
 Mahendra Nath Sardar - Ol Onal (Bhumij) script creator, writer
Ganga Sahay Meena - Founder Editor of Adivasi Sahitya, Writer, Academician

Tribal researchers
 Virginius Xaxa - Deputy Director, Tata Institute of Social Sciences, Guwahati Campus
 Javaid Rahi Tribal author, researcher from Jammu and Kashmir

Independence movement

 Raghoji Bhangare (1805 - 1845)
 Komaram Bheem (1901–1940) – Independence fighter
 Tantia Bhil
 Thalakkal Chanthu
 Rani Gaidinliu (1915–1993) – Political leader, Independence fighter
 Ramji Gond
 Gunda Dhur - Freedom fighter
 Baba Tilka Majhi ( d. 1784) – Independence fighter
 Birsa Munda (1875–1900) – Independence activist
 Sidhu and Kanhu Murmu – Independence activists
 Jirpa Laya
 Bhima Nayak
 Laxman Nayak (1899–1943) – Independence activist
 Alluri Sitarama Raju
 Baburao Shedmake
 Rani Shiromani
 Ganga Narayan Singh
 Veer Narayan Singh
 Raghunath Singh
 Jagannath Singh
 Baidyanath Singh
 Durjan Singh

Politics and social service

 Temjen Imna Along
 Dayamani Barla – Journalist, activist
 Kantilal Bhuria (b. 1950) – Lok Sabha MP, tribal rights activist, former Union Cabinet Minister of Tribal Affairs, Agriculture & Food, veteran Congress leader from Madhya Pradesh.
 Harishankar Brahma – Former Chief Election Commissioner of India
 Dasarath Deb- Former chief Minister of Tripura and CPIM politician
Shürhozelie Liezietsu
 Mohanbhai Sanjibhai Delkar Six-time member of the Lok Sabha of India from Dadra and Nagar Haveli. Tribal leader of southern Part of Gujarat, Tribal Robin Hood
 Kishore Chandra Deo (b. 1947) – Lok Sabha MP, tribal rights activist, former Union Cabinet Minister of Tribal Affairs, Steel & Mines, Tribal Chief of Kurupam, veteran Congress leader from Andhra Pradesh.
 Tulsi Gowda - Environmentalist
 C K Janu – Social activist
 Mahendra Karma – Politician
 Sushila Kerketta – member of the 14th Lok Sabha of India
 Geeta Koda – Member of parliament and former MLA
 Madhu Koda ( b. 1971) – Former chief minister of Jharkhand and former Member of parliament
 Lalthanhawla (b. 1942) – Politician
 Kariya Munda – Former Deputy Speaker, 15th Lok Sabha
 Tulasi Munda – Education activist
 Draupadi Murmu – 15th President of India
 Ramvichar Netam – Politician
 Jual Oram – Politician
 Kartik Oraon – Politician
 Vincent Pala (b. 1968) – Lok Sabha MP, former Union Minister of Water Resources, Congress leader.
 Kanjibhai Patel (b. 1936) - Politician
 Rahibai Soma Popere - Conservationist
 Neiphiu Rio – Politician
 Shibu Soren - Jharkhand Movement leader, third CM of Jharkhand, Member of Parliament
 Soni Sori – Political activist
 Zoramthanga – Politician
Shantu Larma – Politician

Art and literature

 Temsula Ao – Poet, writer
 Teejan Bai – Indian Pandavani performer
 Rupnath Brahma – Poet
 Mamang Dai – Journalist, author, former civil servant
 Anuj Lugun – Indian polymath
 Ram Dayal Munda – Scholar, artist, Padma Sri awardee
 Bhajju Shyam – Artist
 Jangarh Singh Shyam – Artist, founder of Jangarh Kalam
 Venkat Shyam – Artist
 Durga Bai Vyom – Artist

Administration

 G C Murmu – IAS
 Armstrong Pame – IAS
 Rajeev Topno – IAS

Sports

Archery
 Laxmirani Majhi – Archer
 Limba Ram – Archer

Athletics
 Thonakal Gopi – Marathon
 Kavita Raut – Athlete

Boxing
 MC Mary Kom – Boxer

Football
 Talimeren Ao – Indian Footballer
 Sanjay Balmuchu – Footballer
 Pranjal Bhumij - Indian Footballer
 Baichung Bhutia – Former captain, Indian football team
 Durga Boro – Footballer
 Lal Mohan Hansda – Footballer
 Jeje Lalpekhlua – Footballer
 Munmun Lugun – Footballer
 Shylo Malsawmtluanga – Footballer
 Lalrindika Ralte – Footballer

Hockey
 Lalremsiami – Forward, Indian Women's Hockey
 Lazarus Barla – Hockey
 Deep Grace Ekka – Hockey
 Michael Kindo – Former member, Indian men's hockey team, Arjuna awardee
 Jyoti Sunita Kullu – Former member, Indian women's hockey team
 Birendra Lakra – Indian hockey team
 Bimal Lakra – Hockey
 Sunita Lakra – Indian women's hockey team
 Lilima Minz – Hockey
 Jaipal Singh Munda – Former Captain, Indian national hockey team, Adivasi activist.
 Nikki Pradhan – Hockey
 Amit Rohidas – Hockey
 Masira Surin – Indian women's hockey team
 Namita Toppo – Hockey
 Salima Tete – Indian women's hockey team
 Sumrai Tete - Hockey, Dhyan Chand Award winner
 Dilip Tirkey – Former captain, Indian hockey team
 Ignace Tirkey – Hockey
 Prabodh Tirkey – Hockey
 Manohar Topno – Hockey
 William Xalco – Hockey

Mountaineering
 Malavath Purna – Mountaineer

Cricket
 Jogeswar Bhumij

Military

 Rani Durgavati – Gond Queen
 Albert Ekka – Param Vir Chakra, Indo-Pakistani War of 1971
 Nuduram Soren  - Vir Chakra, 2020–2021 China–India skirmishes
 Sangram Shah

Others

 Thirumangai Alvar
 Bhima Bhoi
 Boa Sr.
 Kalicharan Brahma
 Haipou Jadonang
 Shürhozelie Liezietsu
 Gambhir Singh Mura
 Kannappa Nayanar
 Angami Zapu Phizo
 Shabari
 Neiliezhü Üsou
 Valmiki – Composer of Ramayana
 Mohanbhai Sanjibhai Delkar -Tribal Leader

Gallery
Some portraits and images of adivasi people.

See also

 
 Chakma
 C. K. Janu
 Chhotanagpur Front
 Chhotanagpur Plateau Praja Parishad
 Eklavya Model Residential School
 Great Andamanese
 Hanumappa Sudarshan
 India tribal belt
 Jarawa people (Andaman Islands)
 Krantikari Mukti Morcha
 Kumar Suresh Singh
 List of indigenous peoples of South Asia
 List of Scheduled Tribes in India
 Patalkot
 Shompen people
 Tribal religions in India

Notes

References

Sources

Further reading
 Dasgupta, Sangeeta. "Adivasi studies: From a historian's perspective." History Compass 16.10 (2018): e12486. Adivasi studies: From a historian's perspective
 Dube, Shyama CharanTribal Heritage of India, (Indian Institute of Advanced Study, Indian Council of Social Science Research, Anthropological Survey of India. Published by Vikas Pub. House, 1977). .
 Elst, Koenraad. Who is a Hindu? (2001) 
  
 Russell, R. V., The Tribes and Castes of the Central Provinces of India, London, 1916.
 Raj, Aditya & Papia Raj (2004) "Linguistic Deculturation and the Importance of Popular Education among the Gonds in India" Adult Education and Development 62: 55–61
 Vindicated by Time: The Niyogi Committee Report (edited by S.R. Goel, 1998) (1955)
 Tribal Movements in India, by Kumar Suresh Singh. Published by Manohar, 1982.
 Tribal Society in India: An Anthropo-historical Perspective, by Kumar Suresh Singh. Published by Manohar, 1985.

External links

Number of people who believed in tribal religion in census of India (1871–1941 ).pdf
Adivasi are the real inhabitants of india: Supreme court
Adivasi are the real inhabitants of india: Supreme court Judgement.pdf
Adivasi Picture Collection at Kamat.com

 
Indigenous peoples of South Asia
Social groups of India
Ethnic groups in India
Scheduled Tribes of India
Political terminology in India
Ethnic groups in South Asia